Stanley Reed may refer to:

Stanley Forman Reed (1884–1980), American Supreme Court Justice
Stanley Reed (artist) (1908–1978), British artist
Sir Stanley Reed (British politician) (1872–1969), British Conservative politician
Stanley Foster Reed (1917–2007), publisher who founded Reed Research Inc.
Stanley John Reed (1943–2006), South African yachtsman, see Bertie Reed